Lanoh, also known by the alternative name Jengjeng, is an endangered aboriginal Aslian language spoken in Perak, a state of western Malaysia.

It belongs to the Senoic subfamily of languages, which also includes Sabüm (its closest language but now extinct), Semnam, Temiar and Semai, all spoken in the same state.

See also 
 Lanoh people

References

External links 
 RWAAI (Repository and Workspace for Austroasiatic Intangible Heritage)
 Lanoh in RWAAI Digital Archive

Languages of Malaysia
Aslian languages